The Lusatian dialects (German: Lausitzisch) are East Central German (High German) dialects spoken in southern Brandenburg and eastern Saxony. The name "Lusatian" derives from the term Lusatia, meaning the dialects of Lusatia. They are most closely related to Silesian German.

Berlin and Brandenburg originally lay in the Low German language area. Through immigration to Berlin from (then) Central German-speaking regions like Silesia and Saxony, the city's Low German dialect has been strongly influenced by Central German, so that it evolved from a Low German into a Central German (High German) variant, which then spread from Berlin to the surrounding areas of Brandenburg.

The Slavic languages of Lower and Upper Sorbian, which are spoken in Lusatia as well, are also sometimes referred to as Lusatian languages.

Main dialect groups 
 Eastern Lusatian (spoken in Eastern Upper Lusatia)
 Low Lusatian (spoken in Lower Lusatia and northern Upper Lusatia)
 New Lusatian (spoken in the area of settlement of the Sorbs; influenced by the Sorbian languages)
 Upper Lusatian (spoken in southern Upper Lusatia; with an American r)
 Western Lusatian (spoken in Western Upper Lusatia)

References 

Brandenburg
Central German languages
German dialects
Languages of Germany